Edgar Allen McCulloch (August 1, 1861 – January 23, 1933) was an associate justice of the Supreme Court of Arkansas from 1904 to 1909, Chief Justice from 1909 to 1927, and a member of the Federal Trade Commission from 1927 to 1933.

Born in Trenton, Tennessee, McCulloch gained admission to the bar in Marianna, Arkansas in 1883.

He was elected to the Arkansas Supreme Court in 1904 and served for 18 years, resigning in 1927 to accept an appointment from President Calvin Coolidge to the Federal Trade Commission. He was chairman of that body from January 16, 1929, to November 30, 1929.

A month after receiving surgery to overcome a long stomach illness, he died from an apparent coronary thrombosis.

References

External links
Find-a-Grave entry for Edgar A. McCulloch

1861 births
1933 deaths
People from Trenton, Tennessee
U.S. state supreme court judges admitted to the practice of law by reading law
Justices of the Arkansas Supreme Court
Federal Trade Commission personnel
Coolidge administration personnel
Hoover administration personnel